Aleksandr Kidyayev (born 1940) is a retired Soviet light-heavyweight weightlifter. He won a silver medal at the 1965 World Championships and set a world record in the press in 1968.

References

1940 births
Living people
Soviet male weightlifters
World Weightlifting Championships medalists
Place of birth missing (living people)
European Weightlifting Championships medalists